Serkan Yıldık  (born 23 September 1982) is a Turkish former professional footballer who played as a midfielder.

He formerly played for Erzurumspor, Erzincanspor, Gaziosmanpaşaspor and Göztepe. Yıldık appeared in seven Süper Lig matches for Erzurumspor between 1998 and 2001.

References

1982 births
Living people
Turkish footballers
Association football midfielders
Göztepe S.K. footballers
Erzincanspor footballers
Turkey youth international footballers
Süper Lig players